Vernon Elwood Booher (1907 – April 24, 1929) was a Canadian mass murderer who killed four people, including his mother and brother, in Mannville, Alberta on July 9, 1928. He shot his victims with a rifle. Booher was convicted of all four murders, sentenced to death, and executed in 1929.

Murders and confession 
On July 9, 1928, Booher fatally shot his mother, Eunice, his brother, Fred, and two farm hands, Gabriel Grombey and Wasyl Rozak, with a rifle. He was arrested not long after.

Booher's case drew attention after Adolph Langsner, a psychiatrist who claimed to be able to read minds, correctly guessed that Booher was the murderer and where he had hidden the weapon used. Booher confessed and said he killed his mother since she did not like his girlfriend, and killed the others since they were witnesses. Booher was charged with four counts of murder, found guilty, and received a mandatory death sentence without a recommendation for mercy.

On appeal, Booher won a new trial and had his confession suppressed. He was convicted a second time and received had his death sentence reinstated, once more without a recommendation for mercy. Booher was executed at the Fort Saskatchewan Provincial Gaol on April 24, 1929.

References 

1907 births
1929 deaths
20th-century executions by Canada
Canadian mass murderers
Canadian people convicted of murder
Executed Canadian people
Executed mass murderers
Familicides
Mass murder in Canada
Mass murder in 1928
People convicted of murder by Canada
People executed by Canada by hanging
People executed for murder
People from the County of Minburn No. 27
Mass murder in Alberta